Alberto Nagel is an Italian businessman, CEO of Mediobanca since 2008.

Education 
After taking his high-school diploma from Liceo Classico "Istituto Leone XIII" in 1984, he graduated in Economics and Business Studies from the Bocconi University in Milan in 1990.

Career 
Alberto Nagel joined Mediobanca on 2 April 1991 and has spent his whole working life at the bank, taking on increasing degrees of responsibility as his career has progressed. To begin with he worked in the Finance division, before moving to the General Secretariat of which he was made head in 1997. As the Bank's organizational structure changed, he later became head of the Investment Banking division.
Nagel was promoted to officer on 1 April 1995, and became Central Manager on 1 February 1998, Deputy General Manager on 12 April 2002, and General Manager on 14 April 2003. In July 2007, he was appointed Managing Director and in October 2008 Chief Executive Officer, the position which he holds to this day.

In the 1990s he was involved in the big italian privatizations covered by Mediobanca, including Enel (1999), BNL (1998) and Finmeccanica (2000).
In the same years he was also heavily involved in some of the largest M&A deals of the period. In 1994–95 he covered the takeover of Credito Romagnolo by Credito Italiano; in 1999 he was involved in the Olivetti bid for Telecom Italia; and in 2000–01 he took part in the takeover bid launched by Assicurazioni Generali for INA. He was also involved in the consolidation processes between the italian co-operative banks.

As Mediobanca Chief Executive Officer Alberto Nagel followed M&A operations for over EUR 400 billions.
In 2004, in his capacity as general manager of Mediobanca, he presented the Bank's first business plan to the financial community. He was also the driving force behind the 2014–16 strategic plan unveiled by Mediobanca on 21 June 2013, a plan which was widely hailed by the italian and international press as a major turning point for Italian capitalism.
The new equilibrium which Nagel's plan has achieved by diversifying the Bank's businesses has delivered impressive results and repositioned the Bank. His credentials include the expansion of Mediobanca's Corporate & Investment Banking di Mediobanca activities on international markets with the opening of branch offices in Paris (2004), Moscow and Luxembourg (2005), Frankfurt, Madrid and New York City (2007), London (2008), and Istanbul (2013).
In conjunction with the opening of these new international branch offices, the Mediobanca Group has profoundly overhauled its retail operations. This process began in 2007 with Compass's acquisition of Linea S.p.A., and continued in 2008 with the debut of the new Group retail arm CheBanca!, which today is one of the leading Italian digital banks.

At end 2015 this growth in retail banking was consolidated with the acquisition of Barclays’ italian retail banking activities. In the same year Nagel launched Mediobanca's involvement in the alternative asset management segment with the acquisition of a controlling interest in UK-based credit asset manager Cairn Capital.

In 2016 Alberto Nagel unveiled the Group's new three-year strategic plan which will take Mediobanca up to 2019, one of the main pillars of which is to step up the development of Wealth Management activities, operating in synergy with the core Corporate & Investment Banking business.
This objective provides the rationale for the acquisition of full control of Banca Esperia, announced by Nagel when the plan was unveiled, and seen as strategic to the development of private banking services for high net worth individuals.

In 2018 Alberto Nagel led Mediobanca to the acquisition of a 69% stake in the share capital of RAM Active Investments (RAM AI), systematic asset management company based in Geneva.

Other positions held 
Alberto Nagel served as Statutory Auditor of Assicurazioni Generali from 1996 until 2004, when he became Director of the company. In 2010 he was appointed Deputy Chairman of Assicurazioni Generali, a position from which he resigned in April 2012 after changes were made to Italian legislation by the government led by Mario Monti, making it impossible for directors to hold positions on the Boards of banks and insurance companies simultaneously. He also served as a Director of Banca Esperia from July 2000 until April 2012, and was a member of the Board of the Italian banking association (Associazione Bancaria Italiana, or "ABI") from 2007 to 2012.

Personal life
Alberto Nagel is married with two children. He lives in Italy but divides his time between Milan and London where he works part of the week.

References 

Living people
1965 births
Italian chief executives